The All Hallows Church is a Church of England parish church in Wellingborough, Northamptonshire. The church is a Grade I listed building.

History
The church was built in 1160. Dedication to All Hallows recorded in 1517.

Construction of the existing tower began  and took 20 years to complete.

On 23 September 1950, All Hallows Church was designated a Grade I listed building.

References

External links
 Parish website

Wellingborough
Wellingborough
Wellingborough
Wellingborough
Wellingborough